Brianna Walle (born April 25, 1984) is an American former racing cyclist.

Major results

2013
 10th Time trial, National Road Championships
2014
 1st  Overall Tour de Feminin-O cenu Českého Švýcarska
1st  Sprints classification
1st Stage 5
 7th Time trial, National Road Championships
2015
 2nd Overall San Dimas Stage Race
1st  Sprints classification
1st Stage 3
 3rd Criterium, National Road Championships
 5th Overall Redlands Bicycle Classic
 5th Overall BeNe Ladies Tour
 6th Overall Tour of the Gila
 9th Overall La Route de France
 9th Chrono Gatineau
 10th Philadelphia Cycling Classic
2016
 4th Overall Joe Martin Stage Race
 4th Overall Tour of the Gila
 5th Winston-Salem Cycling Classic
 5th Philadelphia Cycling Classic
 8th Chrono Gatineau

References

External links

Living people
1984 births
American female cyclists
21st-century American women